Bambusa basihirsuta is a species of Bambusa bamboo.

Synonyms 
Bambusa basihirsuta  are 5 synonyms.

Distribution 
Bambusa basihirsuta is endemic to Guangdong and Zhejiang provinces of China.

Description 
Bambusa basihirsuta has 3 lodicules, all membranous and ciliate. It has anthers that are 7 mm long. It has 2 to 3 stigmas. It can grow to a 700–1200 cm in height, enabled by a 60–90 mm diameter woody stem.

References 

basihirsuta
Flora of Zhejiang
Flora of Guangdong
Plants described in 1940